Carl H. Stevens Jr. (November 4, 1929 – June 3, 2008) was an American clergyman. He began a Christian religious group known as "The Bible Speaks." He was the founder of Stevens School of the Bible, former Pastor of Greater Grace World Outreach, and Chancellor at Maryland Bible College & Seminary.  Stevens was an early pioneer of radio and television evangelism, in his capacity as the host of the Christian radio broadcasts, Telephone Time and The Grace Hour. He died on June 3, 2008, at the age of 79.  Carl Stevens, The Bible Speaks, and Greater Grace World Outreach have been investigated by multiple organizations for cult-like practices including swindling people out of money and spiritual abuse by leadership.

References

External links
 Carl Stevens Memorial site

1929 births
2008 deaths
American Christian clergy
American evangelists
American television evangelists
Christian writers
20th-century American clergy